Yaa is a feminine given name originating from the  Akan day naming system, meaning born on a Thursday. Day names are a cultural practice of the Akan people of Ghana.  Although some might believe it is mostly practised by Ashanti people, it is actually practised by all Akan (i.e. all the various Akan subgroups) people who follow traditional customs. People born on particular days are supposed to exhibit the characteristics or attributes and philosophy, associated with the days. Yaa has the appellation Busuo or Seandze meaning brave. Thus, females named Yaa are supposed to be brave.

Origin and meaning of Yaa 
In the Akan culture, day names are known to be derived from deities. Yaa  is originated from Yawoada and known as the Day of reproduction. Females born on Thursday are courageous and aggressive in a warlike manner. They tend to be guarded, judgemental and appear to be ungrateful.

Female variants of Yaa 
Day names in Ghana have varying spellings. This is so because of the various Akan subgroups. Each Akan subgroup has a similar or different spelling for the day name to other Akan subgroups. Yaa is spelt Yaa by the Akuapem and Ashanti subgroups whiles Fante subgroups use the name Aba.

Male version of Yaa 
In the Akan culture and other local cultures in Ghana, day names come in pairs for males and females. The variant of the name used for a male child born on Thursday Yaw.

Notable people with the name 
People with this name include:
 Yaa Asantewaa (–1921), Ashanti queen mother and military rebel leader
Yaa Avoe (born 1982), Ghanaian football defender
Yaa Gyasi (born 1989), Ghanaian-American novelist
Yaa Yaa (born 1990), Ghanaian singer-songwriter, recording artist and actress
Maame Yaa Tiwaa Addo-Danquah (born 1969), Commandant of the Ghana Police Command and Staff College
Phillippa Yaa de Villiers (born 1966), South African writer and performance artist

See also 
 Yaw (name)

References

Ashanti given names
Akan given names
Feminine given names